The Embassy of Belarus in Kyiv is the diplomatic mission of Belarus in Ukraine.

History 
Diplomatic relations between Ukraine and Belarus established December 27, 1991. Embassy of Ukraine in Belarus was launched June 30, 1992. Belarus embassy in Kyiv was opened October 12, 1993.

History of the embassy building
The mansion, on the basis of which a new complex of buildings and structures of the Embassy of the Republic of Belarus in Kyiv was formed, was designed by the famous Kyiv architect Vasyl Osmak and is located in the Shevchenkivskyi district of Kyiv at Mykhailo Kotsyubynskoho Street, 3. It has had its modern name since 1939 in honor of the 75th anniversary of the birth of Ukrainian writer Mykhailo Kotsyubynsky, author of the novel , and others. The mansion is an architectural monument.

A two-storey building with a ground floor, which was previously used as a residential building, where at the end of the 19th and the first half of the 20th century lived Mykhailo Dieterichs – surgeon, doctor of medicine, professor of Kyiv University of st. Vladimir. The building has a r-shaped configuration with access to the courtyard in the right part of the main facade.

The facades of the building are designed in the Empire style with an asymmetrical composition of the main facade, which highlights the risalit, topped by a triangular pediment with a lunette. Between the risalit and the main volume is a terrace with columns of the Tuscan order. Along the entire main facade is a cornice of simple profile with mutulas. The sheets on the second floor are decorated with pilasters and scapulae. Panels above the windows are decorated with stucco. Rectangular windows. The mansion fits well in terms of storeys, silhouette and style in the surrounding buildings of the street.

The building uses wooden load-bearing elements in the roof and floors. The interiors are designed in the same style as the house itself, with compositional techniques of Art Nouveau style. Preserved fireplace and tiled stove. In front of the building, along the entrance to it, there is an elongated square.

Previous ambassadors
 Arkady Smolich (1918)
 Alexander Tsvikevych (1919)
 Vitaliy Kurashyk (1993–2001)
 Valentin Velichko (2001–2016)
 Ihor Sokol (2016-)

Events
 November 21, 2017, Ukraine in response to the announcement of proclaiming the first secretary of the embassy of Ukraine Igor Skvortsov persona non grata, declared the Belarusian diplomat a persona non grata.

See also 
 Belarus–Ukraine relations
 Foreign relations of Belarus
 Foreign relations of Ukraine
 Embassy of Ukraine, Minsk
 Diplomatic missions in Ukraine
 Diplomatic missions of Belarus

References

External links
 Embassy of Belarus in Kyiv
 Ministry of Foreign Affairs of Belarus
 Ministry of Foreign Affairs of Ukraine

Ukraine
Belarus
Belarus–Ukraine relations